James Evans (9 November 1891 – 26 August 1973) was an English first-class cricketer. He was a right-handed batsman, a right-arm slow bowler and occasionally played as a wicketkeeper. He made his first-class debut for Hampshire in 1913 against the Marylebone Cricket Club. The following season Evans played a single first-class match for Hampshire against the same opposition. With the onset of the First World War county cricket was cancelled until the 1919 season.

Evans next appearance for Hampshire came after the war in the 1920 season. Over the course of the 1920 and 1921 seasons, Evans played thirteen first-class matches for Hampshire, with his final first-class match coming against Yorkshire in May 1921. In Evans fifteen first-class matches for the club he scored 196 runs at a batting average of 10.31, with a high score of 41. In addition Evans took a single first-class wicket and took ten catches and made a single stumping. 	

Evans died at Upham, Hampshire on 26 August 1973.

External links
James Evans at Cricinfo
James Evans at CricketArchive
Matches and detailed statistics for James Evans

1891 births
1973 deaths
Sportspeople from Shropshire
English cricketers
Hampshire cricketers